Kate Woods is an Australian film and television director who has directed and produced mini series, television shows, pilots and feature films.

Career 
Woods made her feature film directorial debut with the film Looking for Alibrandi (2000), which won 5 AACTA Awards from Australian Film Institute, including Best Film.

Filmography

Director

Films 

 Looking for Alibrandi

TV 
 G. P., Phoenix
 Police Rescue
 Person of Interest (TV series) 
 Changi,
 Escape from Jupiter Heartland 
 Crossing Jordan,
 Without a Trace 
 Bones,
 Castle,
 NCIS: Los Angeles 
 Hawaii Five-0
 Private Practice 
 Law & Order: Special Victims Unit 
 Body of Proof 
 Agents of S.H.I.E.L.D. 
 Unsolved 
 Underground 
 The Good Lord Bird

List of awards and nominations received by Kate Woods

References

External links

Australian expatriates in the United States
Australian film directors
Australian television directors
Australian women film directors
Australian women television directors
Living people
Place of birth missing (living people)
Year of birth missing (living people)